The Stelios Kyriakides Stadium (previous Pafiako Stadium) is a multi-use stadium in Paphos, the stadium holds 9,394 people. It has a full size running track around the outside of its football and rugby playing field and is used for many athletics events throughout the year. It is regarded as one of the best pitches in Cyprus and situated ideally for the public. Until 25 May 2017 its name was Pafiako Stadium, but Cyprus Sport Organisation change its name to Stelios Kyriakides Stadium after marathon runner Stelios Kyriakides.

It is the home stadium of AEP Paphos and AEK Kouklia now play there as well following their promotion to the Cypriot First Division. It was the home stadium also of APOP and Evagoras, but was used also as home by APOP Kinyras Peyias, when they were playing in the First Division during 2005–06 season. GSK Stadium, or Gymnastic Club Korivos Stadium was the home of APOP and Evagoras before the Pafiako was built. In 1992, the UEFA European Under-16 Football Championship was hosted in Cyprus and three matches of the tournament were hosted in Pafiako stadium. Also various music venues took place here.

The stadium has also become the home of the National Rugby Team of Cyprus, having played a total of 3 games there and winning all. The first game of the European 3D tournament in 2007 between Cyprus and Azerbaijan was played there. The stadium has only become the official national team stadium since 2010, where Cyprus overcame Azerbaijan and Bosnia respectively to gain promotion into the 2nd tier of European Rugby. It also hosted the final stage of the European Sevens in a two-day tournament.

On 25 May 2017, K.O.A (Cyprus Athletic Association) decided to rename the stadium to Στελιος Κυριακίδης (Stelios Kyriakides Stadium) in honor of the Boston Marathon of 1946 winner from Statos Agios Fotios village.

References

External links
worldstadiums

Athletics (track and field) venues in Cyprus
Sports venues in Cyprus
Music venues in Cyprus
Football venues in Cyprus
Buildings and structures in Paphos
Pafos FC
Sports venues completed in 1985
1985 establishments in Cyprus